Midaellobes is a genus of moths belonging to the subfamily Tortricinae of the family Tortricidae. It contains only one species, Midaellobes rubrostrigana, which is found in Madagascar.

Larvae have been recorded feeding on an unidentified Euphorbiaceae species.

See also
List of Tortricidae genera

References

External links
tortricidae.com

Archipini
Tortricidae genera